, better known as , is a Japanese comedian represented by SMA Neet Project. He dropped out from Asahikawa University.

Filmography

TV series

Advertisements

Internet series

Film

References

External links
 
 

Japanese comedians
1972 births
Living people
People from Suginami
Comedians from Tokyo
Asahikawa University alumni